The Piranhas River, also known as the Açu River, is a river of northeastern Brazil. It originates in southeastern Paraíba state, near the border with Ceará, and flows north-northeast through Paraíba and Rio Grande do Norte states to empty into the Atlantic Ocean near Macau. Its chief tributary is the Seridó, which originates in the Borborema Plateau of central Paraíba and flows northwest to meet the Piranhas.

References 

Rivers of Paraíba
Rivers of Rio Grande do Norte